Redmond is a town in the Great Southern region of Western Australia. It is located 399 km south-south-east of Perth and the closest populated town is Albany.

The town began when a railway siding was opened in the area in 1912 which was initially called Mulikupp.
The townsite was later renamed to Redmond. In 1913 blocks were subdivided and by 1916 a school had been built and the town was gazetted. It is thought that the town was named after the Irish Nationalist leader, John Edward Redmond.
A sawmill was established near the town along Albany Highway in 1997 by the Gatti brothers that specialised in local hardwoods such as jarrah, marri and wandoo to make floorboards, decking and structural timber. The mill was sold to C.J. Matters in 2015.

References 

Great Southern (Western Australia)
Towns in Western Australia